, known as Wild Knights Gulkeeva and Beast Warriors Gulkeeva, is an anime television series that debuted in 1995. It is an animated adaptation of a manga that was initially serialized in the Shōnen Sunday Super.

Synopsis
The story takes place in a world known as Earthside, which exists along with three other inhabited worlds, Nosfertia, Heavenstia, and Eternalia. When beings known as Darknoids descended from Nosfertia and began their assault on Earthside, Heavenstia sent 3 Animanoids (beast-humans) to prevent an invasion. Meanwhile, the protagonist, Touya, who believed himself to be a human discovered that he was actually a being of Eternalia. With this in mind, Touya fights beside the Animanoids to defend Earthside.

Characters

 
 
 An ordinary teenager who is told by his parents that he is a being who hails from the world of Eternalia and the reincarnation of a legendary knight known as Radias. He must now fight along his beast guardians in order to protect Japan from siege.

 Greyfus  
 
 Greyfus is a wolf.

 Beakwood   
 
 Beakwood is an eagle.

Garriel 
 
 Garriel is a gorilla.

Release

Reception

References

External links

1995 anime television series debuts
Shogakukan franchises
Sunrise (company)
TV Tokyo original programming